Actin-related protein 3 is a protein that in humans is encoded by the ACTR3 gene.

Function 

The specific function of this gene has not yet been determined; however, the protein it encodes is known to be a major constituent of the ARP2/3 complex. This complex is located at the cell surface and is essential to cell shape and motility through lamellipodial actin assembly and protrusion.

Interactions 

ACTR3 has been shown to interact with Cortactin.

References

Further reading

External links 
 
 

Human proteins